Jonathan Cocker (born 24 August 1986) is a British racing driver. In 2012 he won the  ELMS GTE Pro Championship. He competed in the American Le Mans Series (ALMS) for Drayson Racing, a team run by Paul Drayson.

Career
Cocker, who was born in Cheshire, began his racing career in T Cars in 2001, aged 14. In 2003, he progressed to the Porsche Carrera Cup Great Britain, finishing fourth in the standings. He also competed in a Porsche Supercup event at Silverstone Circuit in support of the British Grand Prix. In 2004 he became the youngest driver to win the British GT Championship, aged 18. In 2005 he won the Porsche Carrera Cup Asia.

In 2006, Cocker began racing an Aston Martin DBRS9 for Barwell Motorsport in the FIA GT3 European Championship and British GT Championship. In 2007, he shared the bio-ethanol powered car in British GT with United Kingdom Minister Paul Drayson, the pair finishing second. In 2008, Cocker graduated with Drayson-Barwell Racing to the American Le Mans Series (ALMS) racing an Aston Martin Vantage GT2.

In 2009, Cocker and Drayson made their debuts at the 24 Hours of Le Mans in the Vantage GT2, sharing with Marino Franchitti. Cocker and Drayson also drove the car in the 2009 Le Mans Series season. At the end of the season, the team switched to an LMP1 Lola B09/60-Judd, racing the car at two rounds of the ALMS and in the Asian Le Mans Series. Cocker achieved Pole and fastest lap in both races.

In 2010 Cocker and Drayson competed the season in ALMS in the Lola Judd B12/60 LMP1 bioethanol race car with Cocker (after taking pole) and Drayson achieved their first victory in ALMS during 2010 at Road America when Cocker went from fourth to first in the last four laps of the race.

Cocker came 3rd in the ALMS LPM1 championship with Drayson Racing who came 3rd in the LMP1 Teams Championship.

In 2012 Cocker competed with JMW Motorsport returning to the Le Mans Endurance Series in the GTE Pro Class in a Ferrari 458 Italia. Cocker won the first  race at Paul Ricard followed by pole and a second win at Donington Park which led to him being crowned ELMS GTE Pro Champion, the 3rd title of his career.

Cocker competed for the 3rd time at the infamous Le Mans 24hr with James Walker and Roger Wills in the JMW Motorsport  458 Ferrari Italia.

During 2012 Cocker competed with Dempsey Racing in the ALMS Laguna Seca race in their newly acquired Lola Coupe LMP2 race car.

During 2013 Jonny Cocker is currently the Drayson Racing development driver and clocked up 205.941 mph beating the flying kilometre record by more than 35 mph faster than the previous record. "It was fantastic, a really great experience. You dont look at the speedo, you concentrate on doing the best job you can because you  go any faster than flat out. We were confident because of all the work we've put in. Also, we had a few days testing a week or so ago when we went over 200mph, but its doing it on the day that counts".

The record breaking car was a special low drag version of the Drayson B12 69/EV Electric Le Mans prototype car. Normally the car as two motors per wheel, a 30k Wh battery which produces 850 bhp and weighs 1,095 kg. In its world record guise it had special bodywork, a lightweight 20k Wh high powered battery and crucially it weighed less than 1,000 kg ensuring it met the one-tonne electric land speed record car rules.

Jonny Cocker secured a podium spot at the Goodwood Festival of Speed weekend in July 2013 with a third-place finish for the all-electric B12 69/EV. It was the electric hypercar's first high-profile run since it broke the FIA World Electric Land Speed Record for sub-1000 kg cars with Lord Drayson at the wheel. Back in its high downforce circuit specification, the B12 69/EV, which was driven by Jonny Cocker for the weekend and recorded a best time of 47.34 seconds in Sunday's final shootout, just 0.02 secs behind the second placed Peugeot 20 T16 that won at Pikes Peak earlier in the year. This represents a new electric record at the Goodwood Festival of Speed, over 6 seconds faster than the time set when the car made its Goodwood hill debut last year. That underlines the rapid progress being made by Drayson Racing in developing its electric powertrain technology.

24 Hours of Le Mans results

References

External links
 
 
 

1986 births
Living people
People from Cheshire
English racing drivers
British GT Championship drivers
American Le Mans Series drivers
European Le Mans Series drivers
24 Hours of Le Mans drivers
Porsche Supercup drivers
24 Hours of Spa drivers
Blancpain Endurance Series drivers
Sportspeople from Cheshire
Asian Le Mans Series drivers
Porsche Carrera Cup GB drivers
Ecurie Ecosse drivers